Corazón Salvaje (Wild Heart) is a Mexican telenovela produced by José Rendón for Televisa in 1993. In addition to breaking audience records in issue, it is one of the most memorable and most successful telenovelas of all time. It is the third television adaptation by Maria Zarattini, about the legendary love triangle between two young countesses, Monica and Aimée with the illegitimate son of a wealthy landowner, Juan del Diablo. The historical advisor for this telenovela was Jose Ruiz de Esparza who also advised the production of Alondra also starred by Ana Colchero in the title role.

Edith González and Eduardo Palomo starred as protagonists, while Ana Colchero, Ariel López Padilla, Arsenio Campos and the leading actress Claudia Islas starred as antagonists. César Évora, Isaura Espinoza, Yolanda Ventura, the leading actresses Luz María Aguilar, Queta Lavat, Queta Carrasco, and the leading actors Julio Monterde and Enrique Lizalde starred as stellar performances.

Plot
Francisco Alcazar is a wealthy landowner, who owns sugar cane fields. Francisco is married to Sofia, a severe and uncompassionate woman, with whom he has a son named Andres. Before his marriage to Sofia, Francisco had an affair with a married woman who was physically abused by her husband. The woman became pregnant and died when the child was 3 years old.

This love-child is, in fact, Francisco's true firstborn. When this woman became pregnant, her husband refused to recognize the boy as his son. He also did not allow Francisco to recognize the child as his own. Thus, the boy named "Juan", became known as "Juan del Diablo" (Juan of the Devil) because he had no last name. Juan's mother eventually died of the shame and from the physical abuse she had received from her husband.

Juan was raised with no love or instruction, in poverty and neglect. In his early teens, Juan's stepfather dies. Francisco, hiding the fact that Juan is his son, decides to invite him to live at his estate with his family, on the pretext of being a playmate for Andrés. Sofia finds out the truth and tries to send Juan away, to which Francisco objects.

Finally, Francisco has an accident while riding his horse before he could legally recognize Juan as his son. Francisco leaves a letter with his intentions addressed to his friend and lawyer Noel Mancera. Sofia seizes the letter and hides it. On his deathbed, Francisco sends for his son Andrés, and while not telling the truth, asks him to care for Juan as a brother. After his death, Sofía sends Juan away without saying anything to Andrés.

Eventually, Sofia decides to send Andrés to boarding school in Spain. Juan grows up among the sailors and pirates of the port-city, earning a shocking reputation for dirty business (contraband of liquor), ruthlessness, and harboring unbound loyalty from his men. Juan is also a womanizer, his heart is still untaken. He has learned the identity of his biological father because Noel Mancera has told him.

Through the years, Mancera has given Juan some education, and even offered to give him his last name. However, Juan refuses the offer because he feels that a last name is unwarranted in his chosen occupation. Meanwhile, Mónica and Aimée are two beautiful young countesses, daughters of the deceased Count of Altamira, a distant cousin of Sofia de Alcazar. The Altamira family are very respectable in high society, but they now find themselves in bankruptcy.

Their only asset is their nobility and beauty, and the long promise of betrothal between Monica and Andrés. Unfortunately for Mónica, Andres has forgotten about their engagement. While visiting Mexico City, Andres meets Mónica's younger sister. Aimee is beautiful, flirty and selfish. She shows interest in Andrés because he has wealth, influence, and power. Andrés falls completely in love with Aimée, a fact he later shares with his mother when she comes to visit him.

When Sofia returns home, she informs Catalina de Altamira that Andres has broken the engagement with Monica because he is now intent on marrying Aimee. Catalina is mortified at the thought of Monica's heartbreak. With her family's financial ruin in mind, Catalina reluctantly agrees to an engagement between Aimee and Andres. When Monica discovers that Andres has broken their engagement in order to marry her sister, she is immediately heartbroken.

Monica decides to enter a convent to become a nun. Monica denies her feelings for Andres and tells everyone that becoming a nun is her true calling. Meanwhile, Aimée returns to her hometown with her mother. One day, while walking along the beach, she spies Juan taking a bath in his beach house. Aimee had never met Juan and is unaware of his past or his connection to the Alcazar family.

She watches him from a distance, but Juan sees her. Over the next few days, Aimee returns several times to spy on Juan. He decides to confront her and catches her while she's hiding. Soon after, Juan and Aimée fall in love and become lovers. Juan goes away on a business trip and Aimee promises to wait for his return and marry him. When Andres arrives in his hometown, Aimée ignores her promise to Juan and agrees to marry Andres.

Juan returns from his business trip several weeks later as a millionaire. Juan discovers that Aimee is now married to his half-brother and decides to kidnap her so that she carries out her promise. Andres, who knows nothing about his kinship to Juan and the affair between him and his wife, decides to employ him as the steward of Campo Real, his country estate.

Meanwhile, Monica leaves the convent to spend some time in the countryside with her family. Monica quickly discovers the affair between Juan and Aimee. Monica confronts her sister, but Aimee refuses to end her affair with Juan. Since Monica decides to leave the convent, Andres attempts to redeem himself by proposing an engagement between Monica and his friend Alberto de la Serna. Meanwhile, Andres learns that Juan is actually his brother and that he had an unseemly affair with a young lady in his household.

Andres immediately assumes that the lady in question is Monica. Because of this misunderstanding, Monica is pressured to get married immediately. Monica agrees to get married in an attempt to protect Andres and her sister from the impending scandal, but she refuses to marry Alberto. Instead, Monica decides to marry Juan because she believes this is the only way to prevent Aimee to continue her affair with him. In an unexpected turn of events, Juan accepts to marry Monica.

Aimee is filled with jealousy and rage at the thought of Juan being married to her sister. Aimee spends all her time plotting and scheming to destroy Monica's engagement to Juan. Unfortunately for Aimee, Juan is no longer interested in her. He is now captivated by Monica's beauty and her kind demeanor. At the same time, Monica discovers a whole different side to Juan's personality.

Monica learns that despite Juan's rough exterior, he can also be kind, gentle, and noble. Against all odds, Monica and Juan slowly begin to fall in love. Their happiness is short lived when Andres finds out about Juan's affair with Aimée.

Cast

Edith González as Countess Mónica de Altamira Montero de Alcazar y Valle
Eduardo Palomo as Juan "del Diablo" Alcázar y Valle/Francisco Alcázar y Valle
Ana Colchero as Countess Aimeé de Altamira Montero de Alcazar y Valle
Ariel López Padilla as Carlos Andrés Francisco Alcázar y Valle
Enrique Lizalde as Noel Mancera
Claudia Islas as Sofía Molina Vda. de Alcázar y Valle
Luz María Aguilar as Countess Catalina Montero Vda. de Altamira
Arsenio Campos as Alberto de la Serna
Ernesto Yáñez as Bautista Rosales
Yolanda Ventura as Azucena
Javier Ruán as Guadalupe Cajiga
César Évora as Marcelo Romero Vargas
Isaura Espinoza as Amanda Monterrubio Vda. de Romero Vargas
Verónica Merchant as Mariana Romero Vargas/Mariana Mancera
Olivia Cairo as Juanita
Emilio Cortés as Serafín Campero
Ana Laura Espinosa as Lupe
Gerardo Hemmer as Joaquín Martínez
Jaime Lozano as Segundo Quintana
Adalberto Parra as Captain Espíndola
Alejandro Rábago as Pedro
Gonzalo Sánchez as Facundo Gómez "El Tuerto"'
Mónika Sánchez as RosaIndra Zuno as MecheAntonia Marcin as Dolores Peñaloza de AltamiraJulio Monterde as Fray DomingoQueta Lavat as Mother SuperiorArturo Paulet as Lic. MondragónJoana Brito as AnaMaribel Palmer as TeresaQueta Carrasco as Doña Prudencia Santa MaríaMaría Dolores Oliva as TehuaJuan Antonio Llanes as Judge EsperónConchita Márquez as Nun JulianaJorge Valdés García as Bautista Rosales's assistantGéraldine Bazán as Mónica (child)Julián de Tavira as Juan (child)Christian Ruiz as Andrés Alcázar y Valle (child)''
Baldovino
Alicia del Lago
Felio Eliel
Charito Granados
Nelly Horsman
Carl Hillos
Araceli Cordero
Julián Velázquez

Awards

International Broadcasters of Corazón salvaje 
North Central & South America, Caribbean
 
 
 
  
 
 
  
 
 
  
 
 
 
 
 
 
 
Europe, Africa, Asia & Oceania

References

External links

1993 telenovelas
Mexican telenovelas
1993 Mexican television series debuts
1994 Mexican television series endings
Spanish-language telenovelas
Television shows set in Veracruz
Televisa telenovelas